This is a list of episodes from the seventh season of Mannix.

Broadcast history
The season originally aired Sundays at 8:30-9:30 pm (EST).

DVD release
The season was released on DVD by Paramount Home Video.

Episodes

References

Mannix seasons